Islamabad: Rock City is a 2001 documentary film produced by Michael Hirschorn and Shelly Tatro. The film follows the journey of the biggest South Asian rock music band Junoon and struggle they face to become one of the biggest band in the world.

Synopsis
The VH1 News special is the story of a very unlikely Pakistani rock band who have managed to defy politics, culture and fundamentalism all in the name of music. Translated, "Junoon" means "passion" - and that's what this 10- year-old rock group has brought to a Pakistani music scene that has often been forced underground. The group has been banned for nearly half of its existence, yet has still sold millions of records. Two years ago, it won Channel V award in Delhi for "Best International Group", beating out the likes of Backstreet Boys and The Prodigy.

References

External links
 Junoon Official site
 

2001 films
Junoon (band)
American documentary films
Rockumentaries
2001 short films
Films set in Islamabad
Pakistani documentary films
2000s English-language films
2000s American films